Borger may refer to:

Borger (name), a surname and given name
Borger, Netherlands
Borger, Texas, U.S.

See also
 
 Boorger
 Börger
 Borge (disambiguation)
 Børge
 Burger (disambiguation)